Maati ki Banno (English: Matti's Banno) is an Indian television series that aired on Colors, based on the story of an orphaned girl, Avanti who is in search for her land, her family. Who enters a world at once savage and alien to her. The story validates the traditional Indian belief that no matter how vulnerable or fragile one believes one is or how perilous and insurmountable the obstacle...to overcome the most arduous of climbs all you need is a strong will and a good heart.

Plot
Matti Ki Banno is the story of an orphaned girl whose entire life has been a struggle to belong to a people and a land. At the heart of the narrative is Avanti's determination to overcome the feeling of isolation and loneliness that resulted from a dispossession of all the loved ones that she once had and a deep yearning to have a family and a place she can call home. The show takes off from the point when Avanti, now eighteen years old, relates to the viewer her journey from when she was a pampered child of her parents in Muzaffarpur to how she was orphaned and banished to being an extremely ill-treated housemaid (in her own Bua's house) in the far-away land of Mauritius.

In spite of spending the best part of her life amongst people who subjected her to abject destitution and in a country which only served to enhance her feeling of uprootedness, Avanti never gave up on the one thing that eventually made her life turn around — humanness.

Avanti's simplicity and charm wins the heart of the suave, sophisticated Arjun. What follows is a classic fairytale where Avanti's prince charming rescues her from the drudgery of her life as maid. Avanti and Arjun get married in the picturesque country of Mauritius. Avanti finally is convinced that after all destiny did have a plan for her. But soon, the happily-ever-after phase gets interrupted when, to her shock, Avanti realises that her husband Arjun is not what he had promised to be. He has a secret past that he has hidden with a bunch of lies that, if exposed, will shatter the two forever. When Avanti confronts Arjun about his past, he tells her that his real name is Vikram and that he comes from a rich, powerful political family in Chappran Bihar; the reason he hid this from her is that they are unruly, uncivilised, uncouth and ruthless in their ways and beliefs which is why even he has disassociated from them. Being a positivist, Avanti looks for the silver lining and, instead of giving up on fate, uses the opportunity to belong to a large joint family as she always longed to do.

In her need for a family and love she has had for all these years she does not realise that Vikram has not told her the real story. Like a good Indian bahu she decides to reunite Vikram with his family in Chhappra. Avanti's remaining defences are shattered when she comes to Chappra with Vikram and realises that, like the rest of the men in her sasural, her husband was not immune to the corruptible ways of an outlaw life. She witnesses in shock how gradually the loving, responsible Vikram morphs into someone totally alien to her once he is in Chappra. Avanti realizes in horror how in a bid to reunite Vikram with his family she has unknowingly stepped into an abyss of lies, deceit and a trap from which she can never escape. Will Avanti be able to win back Vikram's love? Will her goodness be able to transform the evil in the family where she longs to belong? What is this dark secret Vikram and his family hiding from Avanti? Will she be able to transform this family and change their regressive ways or will she become one of them?

Cast
Via Chaudhary ... Avanti
Jannat Zubair Rahmani ... Avanti as a kid
Manoj Chandila  ... Vikram Singh/Arjun
Natasha Rana ... Baby Buaji 
Raj Premi ... Surya Narayan Singh
Nishigandha Wad ... Janki Singh
Yashodhan Rana ...Jasodhan
Akshay Verma ...
Shiraz Mustafa ...
Alka Shlesha  ...Dadi
Aasiya Kazi ... Saudamini

References

External links

Colors TV original programming
Indian drama television series
2010 Indian television series debuts
2011 Indian television series endings